The Bityug is a river in Voronezh Oblast, Russia.

Bityug may also refer to several rural localities in Russia:
Bityug, Kursk Oblast, a village in 2-y Ponyrovsky Selsoviet of Ponyrovsky District of Kursk Oblast
Bityug, Tula Oblast, a settlement in Krasnodubrovsky Rural Okrug of Volovsky District of Tula Oblast
Bityug, Voronezh Oblast, a settlement in Khlebenskoye Rural Settlement of Novousmansky District of Voronezh Oblast